Prairie Justice is a 1938 American Western "B" movie directed by George Waggner and starring Bob Baker as a singing cowboy.

Plot
Baker plays an undercover marshall investigating a series of stage coach robberies. After his father is killed, he determines to get justice, pretending to be a drifter while gradually gathering clues to the identify of the killers. Early in the story Bob meets Anita, who is trying to save her ranch after all her cattle have been stolen. Bob woes Anita with his guitar. Finally he goes after the bad guys in a shoot-out. After justice had been done, Anita agrees to marry Bob.

Cast
Bob Baker	as 	U.S. Marshal Bob Randall
Dorothy Fay	as 	Anita Benson
Hal Taliaferro	as 	Alfalfa
Jack Rockwell	as 	John Benson
Forrest Taylor	as 	Sheriff Pop Randall
Carleton Young	as 	Dry-Gulch Baker
Glenn Strange	as 	Hank Haynes (Express Agent)
Jack Kirk	as 	Henchman Boots
Dick Dickinson	as 	Committeeman Doc (uncredited)
George Hazel	as 	Townsman (uncredited)
Murdock MacQuarrie	as 	Stage Line Agent (uncredited)
Slim Whitaker	as 	Bert – Stage Guard (uncredited)

Production
Director George Waggner wrote the script, using the pseudonym Joseph West. Fleming Allen wrote several of the songs, including "Starlight on the Prairie", "40 Miles From Water", "High Falutin' Cowboy" and "Trailin' My Way To You". Dorothy Fay, who shortly after filming ended married Tex Ritter, another singing cowboy, provides the love interest. The film is one of the first to introduce a faithful dog as the cowboy's companion.

Critical reception
One reviewer said of Baker's performance: "Baker has good looks, a pleasing personality, and seems to have the intelligence to do better acting than most of the western heroes."  Another said, "Baker is so overconfident in this role, it hurts, but then, this was just one of 10 films he made in 1938."

Notes and references
Citations

Bibliography

External links

1938 Western (genre) films
Universal Pictures films
American Western (genre) films
Films directed by George Waggner
1938 directorial debut films
1938 films
American black-and-white films
1930s American films